Emperor Gong (恭帝 Gongdi, "Reverent Emperor") may refer to:

Emperor Gong of Jin (386–421) 
Emperor Gong of Western Wei (537–557)
Yang You (605–619), referred to as Emperor Gong of Sui
Yang Tong (605–619), Yang You's brother, sometimes also referred to as Emperor Gong of Sui
Chai Zongxun (953–973), Emperor Gong of Later Zhou
Emperor Gong of Song (1271–1323?)